The 2021 Philadelphia Phillies season was the 139th season in the history of the franchise, and its 18th season at Citizens Bank Park. With a loss to the Braves on September 30, they were eliminated from postseason contention for the tenth straight season. This was the first season since exactly a decade earlier in 2011 when the Phillies would finish a season with a winning record, which they clinched with a 5-0 victory over the Miami Marlins on October 1.

Preceding offseason

Player transactions

Players becoming free agents 
 Right-hand pitcher Jake Arrieta – Signed with the Chicago Cubs on February 13, 2021.
 Right-hand pitcher Brandon Workman – Signed with the Chicago Cubs on February 18, 2021.
 Left-hand pitcher José Álvarez – Signed with the San Francisco Giants on March 6, 2021.
 Right-hand pitcher Tommy Hunter – Signed a minor-league contract with the New York Mets on February 14, 2021.
 Outfielder and first baseman Jay Bruce – Signed a minor-league contract with the New York Yankees on February 13, 2021.
 Shorstop Didi Gregorius – Re-signed with the Phillies on February 10, 2021.
 Catcher J. T. Realmuto – Re-signed with the Phillies on January 29, 2021.

Acquisitions 
The Phillies' first offseason acquisition was right-hand pitcher Ian Hamilton, who was claimed off waivers from the Seattle Mariners on December 7. Three days later, on December 10, the team selected New York Yankees shortstop Kyle Holder in the Rule 5 Draft.

Coaching changes 
Pitching coach Bryan Price retired in October 2020, one season into a three-year deal. The Phillies hired former Cincinnati Reds assistant pitching coach Caleb Cotham in his stead; the hire was formally announced on November 20, 2020. The Phillies finalized their pitching staff on January 11, 2021, with two additional changes: assistant pitching coach Dave Lundquist became the bullpen coach, leaving his old position vacant, and former advanced scouting manager Mike Calitri became the quality assurance coach.

Return to in-person attendance 
Due to the COVID-19 pandemic, no fans were in attendance at any MLB games in 2020 until the National League Championship Series. On November 12, 2020, Commissioner of Baseball Rob Manfred said that the MLB would be "more aggressive" about having fans in ballparks, but that in-person attendance was still dependent on local public health authorities. On March 2, the City of Philadelphia announced that, beginning on Opening Day, Citizens Bank Park would be allowed to host fans at 20% capacity (8,800 attendees). Citizens Bank Park implemented a new set of rules for all game attendees, including a face mask requirement, a ban on backpacks and purses, and the use of cashless payments at concession stands and team stores. Additionally, attendees were to be seated in "pods" of between two and six seats, evenly dispersed across the ballpark. All other seats were cordoned off to enforce social distancing.

As COVID-19 restrictions in the city of Philadelphia began to abate, the Phillies announced on May 13 that the capacity limits at Citizens Bank Park would increase from 11,000 to 16,000 on May 21, and that the park would open to full capacity on June 12. After the Philadelphia Department of Public Health announced that most COVID-19 restrictions would be lifted on June 2, the Phillies amended their earlier statement, and began allowing 100% capacity beginning on June 4. Additionally, tailgating in the parking lot was allowed to commence on June 4, and attendees were no longer required to wear face coverings in outdoor areas of the park.

Regular season

Season standings

National League East

National League Wild Card

Record vs. opponents

Game log 

|- style="background:#bfb;"
| 1 || April 1 || Braves || 3–2  || Connor Brogdon (1–0) || Nate Jones (0–1) || — || 8,529 || 1–0
|- style="background:#bfb;"
| 2 || April 3 || Braves || 4–0 || Zack Wheeler (1–0) || Charlie Morton (0–1) || — || 8,582 || 2–0
|- style="background:#bfb;"
| 3 || April 4 || Braves || 2–1 || José Alvarado (1–0) || Chris Martin (0–1) || Héctor Neris (1) || 10,773 || 3–0
|- style="background:#bfb;"
| 4 || April 5 || Mets || 5–3 || Connor Brogdon (2–0) || Trevor May (0–1) || José Alvarado (1) || 10,782 || 4–0
|- style="background:#fbb;"
| 5 || April 6 || Mets || 4–8 || Marcus Stroman (1–0) || Chase Anderson (0–1) || — || 10,752 || 4–1
|- style="background:#bfb;"
| 6 || April 7 || Mets || 8–2 || Connor Brogdon (3–0) || David Peterson (0–1) || — || 10,807 || 5–1
|- style="background:#fbb;"
| 7 || April 9 || @ Braves || 1–8 || Charlie Morton (1–1) || Zack Wheeler (1–1) || — || 14,342 || 5–2
|- style="background:#fbb;"
| 8 || April 10 || @ Braves || 4–5 || Sean Newcomb (1–0) || Archie Bradley (0–1) || Will Smith (2) || 14,394 || 5–3
|- style="background:#bfb;"
| 9 || April 11 || @ Braves || 7–6 || José Alvarado (2–0) || Will Smith (0–2) || Héctor Neris (2) || 14,221 || 6–3
|- style="background:#bbb;"
| – || April 12 || @ Mets || colspan=6 | Postponed (rain); Makeup: April 13 as a straight doubleheader
|- style="background:#fbb;"
| 10 || April 13  || @ Mets || 3–4 || Trevor May (1–1) || Héctor Neris (0–1) || — ||  || 6–4
|- style="background:#fbb;"
| 11 || April 13  || @ Mets || 0–4  || Marcus Stroman (2–0) || Aaron Nola (0–1) || — || 7,611 || 6–5
|- style="background:#fbb;"
| 12 || April 14 || @ Mets || 1–5 || David Peterson (1–1) || Zack Wheeler (1–2) || — || 7,520 || 6–6
|- style="background:#bbb;"
| – || April 15 || @ Mets || colspan=6 | Postponed (rain); Makeup: June 25 as a straight doubleheader
|- style="background:#bfb;"
| 13 || April 16 || Cardinals || 9–2 || Zach Eflin (1–0) || Carlos Martínez (0–3) || — || 10,842 || 7–6
|- style="background:#fbb;"
| 14 || April 17 || Cardinals || 4–9 || Ryan Helsley (2–0) || Matt Moore (0–1) || — || 10,890 || 7–7
|- style="background:#bfb;"
| 15 || April 18 || Cardinals || 2–0 || Aaron Nola (1–1) || John Gant (0–2) || — || 10,876 || 8–7
|- style="background:#fbb;"
| 16 || April 19 || Giants || 0–2 || Kevin Gausman (1–0) || Chase Anderson (0–2) || Wandy Peralta (2) || 9,510 || 8–8
|- style="background:#fbb;"
| 17 || April 20 || Giants || 7–10 || José Álvarez (1–1) || Connor Brogdon (3–1) || — || 10,584 || 8–9
|- style="background:#bfb;"
| 18 || April 21 || Giants || 6–5 || Héctor Neris (1–1) || Wandy Peralta (2–1) || — || 9,537 || 9–9
|- style="background:#fbb;"
| 19 || April 23 || @ Rockies || 4–5 || Mychal Givens (1–1) || Héctor Neris (1–2) || — || 14,025 || 9–10
|- style="background:#bfb;"
| 20 || April 24 || @ Rockies || 7–5 || Aaron Nola (2–1) || Jhoulys Chacín (0–1) || Héctor Neris (3) || 20,214 || 10–10
|- style="background:#fbb;"
| 21 || April 25 || @ Rockies || 2–12 || Jon Gray (3–1) || Chase Anderson (0–3) || — || 20,244 || 10–11
|- style="background:#bfb;"
| 22 || April 26 || @ Cardinals || 2–1 || Zack Wheeler (2–2) || Adam Wainwright (0–3) || Héctor Neris (4) || 12,866 || 11–11
|- style="background:#fbb;"
| 23 || April 27 || @ Cardinals || 2–5 || Carlos Martínez (1–4) || Zach Eflin (1–1) || Alex Reyes (6) || 12,895 || 11–12
|- style="background:#bfb;"
| 24 || April 28 || @ Cardinals || 5–3 || Brandon Kintzler (1–0) || Génesis Cabrera (0–1) || Héctor Neris (5) || 12,701 || 12–12
|- style="background:#fbb;"
| 25 || April 29 || @ Cardinals || 3–4  || Alex Reyes (1–0) || David Hale (0–1) || — || 13,159 || 12–13
|- style="background:#bfb;"
| 26 || April 30 || Mets || 2–1 || Chase Anderson (1–3) || Marcus Stroman (3–2) || Sam Coonrod (1) || 10,914 || 13–13
|-

|- style="background:#fbb;"
| 27 || May 1 || Mets || 4–5 || Trevor May (2–1) || Héctor Neris (1–3) || Edwin Díaz (3) || 10,948 || 13–14
|- style="background:#fbb;"
| 28 || May 2 || Mets || 7–8 || Jacob Barnes (1–0) || Brandon Kintzler (1–1) || Jeurys Familia (1) || 10,964 || 13–15
|- style="background:#bfb;"
| 29 || May 3 || Brewers || 4–3 || Vince Velasquez (1–0) || Adrian Houser (2–3) || Héctor Neris (6) || 10,651 || 14–15
|- style="background:#bfb;"
| 30 || May 4 || Brewers || 6–5 || Aaron Nola (3–1) || Eric Lauer (1–1) || Sam Coonrod (2) || 10,388 || 15–15
|- style="background:#bfb;"
| 31 || May 5 || Brewers || 5–4 || Brandon Kintzler (2–1) || Freddy Peralta (3–1) || José Alvarado (2) || 10,110 || 16–15
|- style="background:#bfb;"
| 32 || May 6 || Brewers || 2–0 || Zack Wheeler (3–2) || Brandon Woodruff (2–1) || — || 10,768 || 17–15
|- style="background:#bfb;"
| 33 || May 7 || @ Braves || 12–2 || Zach Eflin (2–1) || Charlie Morton (2–2) || — || 38,952 || 18–15
|- style="background:#fbb;"
| 34 || May 8 || @ Braves || 7–8  || Jacob Webb (1–1) ||  Enyel De Los Santos (0–1) || — || 39,852 || 18–16
|- style="background:#fbb;"
| 35 || May 9 || @ Braves || 1–6 || Huascar Ynoa (4–1) || Aaron Nola (3–2) || — || 28,829 || 18–17
|- style="background:#bfb;"
| 36 || May 11 || @ Nationals || 6–2 || Chase Anderson (2–3) || Erick Fedde (2–4) || — || 8,559 || 19–17
|- style="background:#bfb;"
| 37 || May 12 || @ Nationals || 5–2  || José Alvarado (3–0) || Brad Hand (2–2) || Héctor Neris (7) || 8,610 || 20–17
|- style="background:#fbb;"
| 38 || May 13 || @ Nationals || 1–5 || Patrick Corbin (2–3) || Zach Eflin (2–2) || — || 8,710 || 20–18
|- style="background:#bfb;"
| 39 || May 14 || @ Blue Jays || 5–1 || Connor Brogdon (4–1) || Trent Thornton (1–1) || — || 1,171 || 21–18
|- style="background:#fbb;"
| 40 || May 15 || @ Blue Jays || 0–4 || Travis Bergen (2–0) || Aaron Nola (3–3) || — || 1,397 || 21–19
|- style="background:#fbb;"
| 41 || May 16 || @ Blue Jays || 8–10 || Robbie Ray (2–1) || Chase Anderson (2–4) || — || 1,107 || 21–20
|- style="background:#bfb;"
| 42 || May 18 || Marlins || 8–3 || Archie Bradley (1–1) || Dylan Floro (2–2) || — || 11,114 || 22–20
|- style="background:#fbb;"
| 43 || May 19 || Marlins || 1–3 || Trevor Rogers (6–2) || Zach Eflin (2–3) || Yimi García (8) || 11,549 || 22–21
|- style="background:#fbb;"
| 44 || May 20 || Marlins || 0–6 || Sandy Alcántara (2–3) || David Hale (0–2) || — || 11,503 || 22–22
|- style="background:#fbb;"
| 45 || May 21 || Red Sox || 3–11 || Martín Pérez (2–2) || Aaron Nola (3–4) || — || 15,279 || 22–23
|- style="background:#fbb;"
| 46 || May 22 || Red Sox || 3–4 || Nathan Eovaldi (5–2) || Spencer Howard (0–1) || Matt Barnes (11) || 15,424 || 22–24
|- style="background:#bfb;"
| 47 || May 23 || Red Sox || 6–2 || Zack Wheeler (4–2) || Eduardo Rodríguez (5–3) || — || 15,360 || 23–24
|- style="background:#fbb;"
| 48 || May 24 || @ Marlins || 6–9 || Adam Cimber (1–1) || Zach Eflin (2–4) || Dylan Floro (1) || 4,527 || 23–25
|- style="background:#bfb;"
| 49 || May 25 || @ Marlins || 2–0 || Vince Velasquez (2–0) || Sandy Alcántara (2–4) || Héctor Neris (8) || 4,864 || 24–25
|- style="background:#fbb;"
| 50 || May 26 || @ Marlins || 2–4 || Ross Detwiler (1–0) || Sam Coonrod (0–1) || Yimi García (9) || 4,760 || 24–26
|- style="background:#bfb;"
| 51 || May 27 || @ Marlins || 3–2 || José Alvarado (4–0) || Yimi García (3–3) || Héctor Neris (9) || 4,932 || 25–26
|- style="background:#fbb;"
| 52 || May 29 || @ Rays || 3–5 || Diego Castillo (2–2) || Sam Coonrod (0–2) || J. P. Feyereisen (2) || 7,316 || 25–27
|- style="background:#fbb;"
| 53 || May 30 || @ Rays || 2–6 || Josh Fleming (5–3) || Zach Eflin (2–5) || — || 7,479 || 25–28
|- style="background:#fbb;"
| 54 || May 31 || @ Reds || 1–11 || Wade Miley (5–4) || Vince Velasquez (2–1) || — || 17,878 || 25–29
|-

|- style="background:#bfb;"
| 55 || June 1 || @ Reds || 17–3 || Aaron Nola (4–4) || Sonny Gray (1–4) || — || 10,788 || 26–29
|- style="background:#bbb
| – || June 2 || @ Reds || colspan=6 | Postponed (rain); Makeup: June 28
|- style="background:#fbb;"
| 56 || June 4 || Nationals || 1–2 || Max Scherzer (5–4) || Zack Wheeler (4–3) || Brad Hand (10) || 15,030 || 26–30
|- style="background:#bfb;"
| 57 || June 5 || Nationals || 5–2 || Ranger Suárez (1–0) || Joe Ross (2–6) || Connor Brogdon (1) || 16,118 || 27–30
|- style="background:#bfb;"
| 58 || June 6 || Nationals || 12–6 || Sam Coonrod (1–2) || Kyle Finnegan (2–1) || — || 15,108 || 28–30
|- style="background:#fbb;"
| 59 || June 8 || Braves || 5–9 || Sean Newcomb (2–0) || Connor Brogdon (4–2) || — || 13,125 || 28–31
|- style="background:#bfb;"
| 60 || June 9 || Braves || 2–1 || Ranger Suárez (2–0) || Will Smith (1–5) || — || 13,552 || 29–31
|- style="background:#bfb;"
| 61 || June 10 || Braves || 4–3  || José Alvarado (5–0) || Chris Martin (0–2) || — || 14,261 || 30–31
|- style="background:#bfb;"
| 62 || June 12 || Yankees || 8–7  || Archie Bradley (2–1) || Aroldis Chapman (4–2) || — || 38,450 || 31–31
|- style="background:#bfb;"
| 63 || June 13 || Yankees || 7–0 || Aaron Nola (5–4) || Domingo Germán (4–4) || — || 38,512 || 32–31
|- style="background:#fbb;"
| 64 || June 14 || @ Dodgers || 1–3 || David Price (2–0) || Spencer Howard (0–2) || Kenley Jansen (16) || 15,761 || 32–32
|- style="background:#fbb;"
| 65 || June 15 || @ Dodgers || 3–5 || Joe Kelly (2–0) || Ranger Suárez (2–1) || Blake Treinen (3) || 52,078 || 32–33
|- style="background:#bfb;"
| 66 || June 16 || @ Dodgers || 2–0 || Zack Wheeler (5–3) || Clayton Kershaw (8–6) || Héctor Neris (10) || 52,157 || 33–33
|- style="background:#fbb;"
| 67 || June 18 || @ Giants || 3–5 || Johnny Cueto (5–3) || Vince Velasquez (2–2) || Jake McGee (14) || 16,170 || 33–34
|- style="background:#bfb;"
| 68 || June 19 || @ Giants || 13–6 || Ranger Suárez (3–1) || Jarlin García (0–2) || — || 16,774 || 34–34
|- style="background:#fbb;"
| 69 || June 20 || @ Giants || 2–11 || Sam Long (1–0) || Zach Eflin (2–6) || — || 18,265 || 34–35
|- style="background:#fbb;"
| 70 || June 22 || Nationals || 2–3 || Max Scherzer (6–4) || Zack Wheeler (5–4) || Brad Hand (16) || 19,652 || 34–36
|- style="background:#fbb;"
| 71 || June 23 || Nationals || 12–13 || Tanner Rainey (1–2) || Héctor Neris (1–4) || Paolo Espino (1) || 17,892 || 34–37
|- style="background:#fbb;"
| 72 || June 25  || @ Mets || 1–2  || Seth Lugo (1–0) || Ranger Suárez (3–2) || — ||  || 34–38
|- style="background:#bfb;"
| 73 || June 25  || @ Mets || 2–1  || Archie Bradley (3–1) || Sean Reid-Foley (2–1) || Héctor Neris (11) || 29,012 || 35–38
|- style="background:#fbb;"
| 74 || June 26 || @ Mets || 3–4 || Edwin Díaz (2–2) || Héctor Neris (1–5) || — || 29,205 || 35–39
|- style="background:#bfb;"
| 75 || June 27 || @ Mets || 4–2 || Zack Wheeler (6–4) || Marcus Stroman (6–6) || Archie Bradley (1) || 25,488 || 36–39
|- style="background:#fbb;"
| 76 || June 28 || @ Reds || 4–12 || Heath Hembree (2–3) || Neftalí Feliz (0–1) || — || 21,006 || 36–40
|- style="background:#bfb;"
| 77 || June 29 || Marlins || 4–3 || Vince Velasquez (3–2) || Trevor Rogers (7–5) || José Alvarado (3) || 18,079 || 37–40
|- style="background:#fbb;"
| 78 || June 30 || Marlins || 6–11 || Zach Pop (1–0) || Aaron Nola (5–5) || — || 17,190 || 37–41
|-

|- style="background:#bbb;"
| – || July 1 || Marlins || colspan=6 | Postponed (rain); Makeup: July 16 as a straight doubleheader
|- style="background:#bfb;"
| 79 || July 2 || Padres || 4–3  || Ranger Suárez (4–2) || Austin Adams (2–2) || — || 22,653 || 38–41
|- style="background:#bfb;"
| 80 || July 3 || Padres || 4–2 || Zach Eflin (3–6) || Yu Darvish (7–3) || Ranger Suárez (1) || 25,053 || 39–41
|- style="background:#fbb;"
| 81 || July 4 || Padres || 1–11 || Austin Adams (3–2) || Vince Velasquez (3–3) || — || 25,592 || 39–42
|- style="background:#bfb;"
| 82 || July 5 || @ Cubs || 13–3 || Connor Brogdon (5–2) || Rex Brothers (2–2) || — || 37,165 || 40–42
|- style="background:#bfb;"
| 83 || July 6 || @ Cubs || 15–10 || Aaron Nola (6–5) || Jake Arrieta (5–9) || — || 30,095 || 41–42
|- style="background:#fbb;"
| 84 || July 7 || @ Cubs || 3–8 || Alec Mills (4–2) || Zack Wheeler (6–5) || — || 28,860 || 41–43
|- style="background:#bfb;"
| 85 || July 8 || @ Cubs || 8–0 || Zach Eflin (4–6) || Adbert Alzolay (4–9) || — || 30,727 || 42–43
|- style="background:#fbb;"
| 86 || July 9 || @ Red Sox || 5–11 || Garrett Richards (5–5) || Vince Velasquez (3–4) || — || 32,641 || 42–44
|- style="background:#bfb;"
| 87 || July 10 || @ Red Sox || 11–2 || Bailey Falter (1–0) || Martín Pérez (7–5) || — || 33,202 || 43–44
|- style="background:#bfb;"
| 88 || July 11 || @ Red Sox || 5–4 || Cristopher Sánchez (1–0) || Nick Pivetta (7–4) || Ranger Suárez (2) || 32,586 || 44–44
|- style="background:#bbcaff;"
| – || July 13 || colspan="7" | 2021 Major League Baseball All-Star Game at Coors Field in Denver
|- style="background:#bfb;"
| 89 || July 16  || Marlins || 5–2  || Archie Bradley (4–1) || Sandy Alcántara (5–9) || Ranger Suárez (3) ||  || 45–44
|- style="background:#fbb;"
| 90 || July 16  || Marlins || 0–7  || Jordan Holloway (2–2) || Zach Eflin (4–7) || — || 28,712 || 45–45
|- style="background:#bfb;"
| 91 || July 17 || Marlins || 4–2  || José Alvarado (6–0) || Yimi García (3–7) || — || 21,390 || 46–45
|- style="background:#bfb;"
| 92 || July 18 || Marlins || 7–4 || Zack Wheeler (7–5) || Anthony Bender (1–1) || Héctor Neris (12) || 20,588 || 47–45
|- style="background:#fbb;"
| 93 || July 20 || @ Yankees || 4–6 || Luis Cessa (3–1) || Aaron Nola (6–6) || Aroldis Chapman (17) || 36,106 || 47–46
|- style="background:#fbb;"
| 94 || July 21 || @ Yankees || 5–6  || Brooks Kriske (1–0) || Ranger Suárez (4–3) || — || 34,112 || 47–47
|- style="background:#fbb;"
| 95 || July 22 || Braves || 2–7 || Charlie Morton (9–3) || Matt Moore (0–2) || — || 22,645 || 47–48
|- style="background:#bfb;"
| 96 || July 23 || Braves || 5–1 || Zack Wheeler (8–5) || Max Fried (7–6) || — || 23,546 || 48–48
|- style="background:#fbb;"
| 97 || July 24 || Braves || 3–15 || Josh Tomlin (4–0) || Vince Velasquez (3–5) || — || 24,479 || 48–49
|- style="background:#bfb;"
| 98 || July 25 || Braves || 2–1 || Aaron Nola (7–6) || Touki Toussaint (1–1) || Ranger Suárez (4) || 19,370 || 49–49
|- style="background:#bfb;"
| 99 || July 26 || Nationals || 6–5 || Archie Bradley (5–1) || Brad Hand (5–5) || — || 23,265 || 50–49
|- style="background:#fbb;"
| 100 || July 27 || Nationals || 4–6 || Wander Suero (2–2) || Matt Moore (0–3) || Brad Hand (21) || 20,135 || 50–50
|- style="background:#bbb;"
| — || July 28 || Nationals || colspan=6 | Postponed (COVID-19 contact tracing); Makeup: July 29 as a straight doubleheader
|- style="background:#fbb;"
| 101 || July 29  || Nationals || 1–3  || Max Scherzer (8–4) || Zack Wheeler (8–6) || Kyle Finnegan (1) ||  || 50–51
|- style="background:#bfb;"
| 102 || July 29  || Nationals || 11–8  || Ranger Suárez (5–3) || Sam Clay (0–4) || — || 19,219 || 51–51
|- style="background:#fbb;"
| 103 || July 30 || @ Pirates || 0–7 || Wil Crowe (3–5) || Vince Velasquez (3–6) || — || 20,591 || 51–52
|- style="background:#fbb;"
| 104 || July 31 || @ Pirates || 2–3 || Chris Stratton (4–0) || José Alvarado (6–1) || — || 32,071 || 51–53
|-

|- style="background:#bfb;"
| 105 || August 1 || @ Pirates || 15–4 || Kyle Gibson (7–3) || Mitch Keller (3–8) || — || 17,875 || 52–53
|- style="background:#bfb;"
| 106 || August 2 || @ Nationals || 7–5 || Archie Bradley (6–1) || Gabe Klobosits (0–1) || — || 16,393 || 53–53
|- style="background:#bfb;"
| 107 || August 3 || @ Nationals || 5–4 || Zack Wheeler (9–6) || Patrick Corbin (6–10) || José Alvarado (4) || 17,417 || 54–53
|- style="background:#bfb;"
| 108 || August 4 || @ Nationals || 9–5 || Matt Moore (1–3) || Paolo Espino (3–3) || — || 18,482 || 55–53
|- style="background:#bfb;"
| 109 || August 5 || @ Nationals || 7–6 || Mauricio Llovera (1–0) || Kyle Finnegan (4–3) || Archie Bradley (2) || 22,575 || 56–53
|- style="background:#bfb;"
| 110 || August 6 || Mets || 4–2 || Kyle Gibson (8–3) || Marcus Stroman (7–11) || Ian Kennedy (17) || 30,106 || 57–53
|- style="background:#bfb;"
| 111 || August 7 || Mets || 5–3 || JD Hammer (1–0) || Tylor Megill (1–2) || Ian Kennedy (18) || 37,057 || 58–53
|- style="background:#bfb;"
| 112 || August 8 || Mets || 3–0 || Zack Wheeler (10–6) || Taijuan Walker (7–7) || — || 39,186 || 59–53
|- style="background:#fbb;"
| 113 || August 10 || Dodgers || 0–5 || Alex Vesia (2–1) || JD Hammer (1–1) || — || 28,333 || 59–54
|- style="background:#fbb;"
| 114 || August 11 || Dodgers || 2–8 || Brusdar Graterol (3–0) || Kyle Gibson (8–4) || — || 32,186 || 59–55
|- style="background:#bfb;"
| 115 || August 12 || Dodgers || 2–1 || Archie Bradley (7–1) || Mitch White (0–1) || Ian Kennedy (19) || 26,122 || 60–55
|- style="background:#fbb;"
| 116 || August 13 || Reds || 1–6 || Tyler Mahle (10–3) || Zack Wheeler (10–7) || — || 26,074 || 60–56
|- style="background:#bfb;"
| 117 || August 14 || Reds || 6–1 || Matt Moore (2–3) || Luis Castillo (6–12) || — || 25,100 || 61–56
|- style="background:#fbb;"
| 118 || August 15 || Reds || 4–7 || Lucas Sims (5–2) || Aaron Nola (7–7) || Mychal Givens (3) || 28,544 || 61–57
|- style="background:#fbb;"
| 119 || August 17 || @ Diamondbacks || 2–3 || Miguel Aguilar (1–1) || Kyle Gibson (8–5) || Tyler Clippard (3) || 7,796 || 61–58
|- style="background:#fbb;"
| 120 || August 18 || @ Diamondbacks || 2–4 || Humberto Castellanos (1–1) || Ranger Suárez (5–4) || Tyler Clippard (4) || 7,968 || 61–59
|- style="background:#fbb;"
| 121 || August 19 || @ Diamondbacks || 2–6 || Madison Bumgarner (7–7) || Zack Wheeler (10–8) || — || 7,165 || 61–60
|- style="background:#bfb;"
| 122 || August 20 || @ Padres || 4–3 || Héctor Neris (2–5) || Blake Snell (6–5) || Ian Kennedy (20) || 40,927 || 62–60
|- style="background:#fbb;"
| 123 || August 21 || @ Padres || 3–4  || Mark Melancon (3–2) || Connor Brogdon (5–3) || — || 43,383 || 62–61
|- style="background:#bfb;"
| 124 || August 22 || @ Padres || 7–4 || Kyle Gibson (9–5) || Ryan Weathers (4–6) || — || 38,548 || 63–61
|- style="background:#fbb;"
| 125 || August 24 || Rays || 1–3 || J. T. Chargois (3–0) || Archie Bradley (7–2) || Andrew Kittredge (3) || 23,402 || 63–62
|- style="background:#fbb;"
| 126 || August 25 || Rays || 4–7 || Collin McHugh (5–1) || Zack Wheeler (10–9) || — || 25,552 || 63–63
|- style="background:#fbb;"
| 127 || August 26 || Diamondbacks || 7–8 || Zac Gallen (2–7) || Matt Moore (2–4) || Noé Ramirez (1) || 20,148 || 63–64
|- style="background:#bfb;"
| 128 || August 27 || Diamondbacks || 7–6  ||  Enyel De Los Santos (1–1) || Taylor Clarke (1–1) || — || 23,181 || 64–64
|- style="background:#bfb;"
| 129 || August 28 || Diamondbacks || 7–0 || Kyle Gibson (10–5) || Humberto Mejía (0–1) || — || 24,692 || 65–64
|- style="background:#bfb;"
| 130 || August 29 || Diamondbacks || 7–4 || Ranger Suárez (6–4) || Madison Bumgarner (7–9) || Ian Kennedy (21) || 22,237 || 66–64
|- style="background:#bfb;"
| 131 || August 30 || @ Nationals || 7–4 || Zack Wheeler (11–9) || Josiah Gray (0–2) || José Alvarado (5) || 17,353 || 67–64
|- style="background:#bfb;"
| 132 || August 31 || @ Nationals || 12–6 || Bailey Falter (2–0) || Patrick Corbin (7–14) || — || 16,844 || 68–64
|-

|- style="background:#bbb;"
| – || September 1 || @ Nationals || colspan=6 | Postponed (rain; remnants of Tropical Storm Ida); Makeup: September 2
|- style="background:#bfb;"
| 133 || September 2 || @ Nationals || 7–6 || Sam Coonrod (2–2) || Andrés Machado (1–1) || Ian Kennedy (22) || 12,280 || 69–64
|- style="background:#fbb;"
| 134 || September 3 || @ Marlins || 3–10 || Steven Okert (1–1) || Kyle Gibson (10–6) || — || 7,073 || 69–65
|- style="background:#fbb;"
| 135 || September 4 || @ Marlins || 2–3 || Anthony Bass (2–7) || Archie Bradley (7–3) || Dylan Floro (8) || 9,256 || 69–66
|- style="background:#bfb;"
| 136 || September 5 || @ Marlins || 4–3  || Ian Kennedy (1–0) || Dylan Floro (5–6) || — || 8,082 || 70–66
|- style="background:#bfb;"
| 137 || September 6 || @ Brewers || 12–0 || Zack Wheeler (12–9) || Brandon Woodruff (9–8) || — || 30,192 || 71–66
|- style="background:#fbb;"
| 138 || September 7 || @ Brewers || 0–10 || Eric Lauer (5–5) || Aaron Nola (7–8) || — || 22,955 || 71–67
|- style="background:#fbb;"
| 139 || September 8 || @ Brewers || 3–4 || Aaron Ashby (2–0) || Connor Brogdon (5–4) || — || 20,654 || 71–68
|- style="background:#fbb;"
| 140 || September 9 || Rockies || 3–4 || Lucas Gilbreath (1–1) || Ian Kennedy (1–1) || Carlos Estévez (6) || 18,071 || 71–69
|- style="background:#fbb;"
| 141 ||  || Rockies || 2–11 || Germán Márquez (12–10) || Bailey Falter (2–1) || — || 22,138 || 71–70
|- style="background:#bfb;"
| 142 || September 11 || Rockies || 6–1 || Zack Wheeler (13–9) || Kyle Freeland (5–8) || — || 23,232 || 72–70
|- style="background:#fbb;"
| 143 || September 12 || Rockies || 4–5 || Ashton Goudeau (1–0) || Héctor Neris (2–6) || Carlos Estévez (7) || 24,099 || 72–71
|- style="background:#fbb;"
| 144 || September 14 || Cubs || 3–6 || Adrian Sampson (1–2) || Kyle Gibson (10–7) || Rowan Wick (4) || 16,170 || 72–72
|- style="background:#bfb;"
| 145 || September 15 || Cubs || 6–5 || Ian Kennedy (2–1) || Trevor Megill (1–2) || — || 16,299 || 73–72
|- style="background:#bfb;"
| 146 || September 16 || Cubs || 17–8 || Héctor Neris (3–6) || Manuel Rodríguez (3–3) || — || 20,208 || 74–72
|- style="background:#bfb;"
| 147 || September 17 || @ Mets || 4–3 || Zack Wheeler (14–9) || Taijuan Walker (7–10) || Ian Kennedy (23) || 26,967 || 75–72
|- style="background:#bfb;"
| 148 || September 18 || @ Mets || 5–3 || Aaron Nola (8–8) || Carlos Carrasco (1–3) || Ian Kennedy (24) || 33,442 || 76–72
|- style="background:#fbb;"
| 149 || September 19 || @ Mets || 2–3 || Aaron Loup (6–0) || Kyle Gibson (10–8) || Edwin Díaz (30) || 24,832 || 76–73
|- style="background:#fbb;"
| 150 || September 20 || Orioles || 0–2 || John Means (6–7) || Ranger Suárez (6–5) || Tyler Wells (3) || 21,440 || 76–74
|- style="background:#bfb;"
| 151 || September 21 || Orioles || 3–2  || Ian Kennedy (3–1) || César Valdez (2–2) || — || 18,955 || 77–74
|- style="background:#bfb;"
| 152 || September 22 || Orioles || 4–3 || José Alvarado (7–1) || Conner Greene (1–2) || Ian Kennedy (25) || 18,133 || 78–74
|- style="background:#bfb;"
| 153 || September 23 || Pirates || 12–6 || Aaron Nola (9–8) || Anthony Banda (2–2) || — || 16,154 || 79–74
|- style="background:#bfb;"
| 154 || September 24 || Pirates || 8–5 || Héctor Neris (4–6) || Chasen Shreve (3–2) || Ian Kennedy (26) || 20,548 || 80–74
|- style="background:#bfb;"
| 155 || September 25 || Pirates || 3–0 || Ranger Suárez (7–5) || Wil Crowe (4–8) || — || 28,135 || 81–74
|- style="background:#fbb;"
| 156 || September 26 || Pirates || 0–6 || Max Kranick (2–3) || Hans Crouse (0–1) || — || 29,336 || 81–75
|- style="background:#fbb;"
| 157 || September 28 || @ Braves || 1–2 || Charlie Morton (14–6) || Zack Wheeler (14–10) || Will Smith (36) || 29,238 || 81–76
|- style="background:#fbb;"
| 158 || September 29 || @ Braves || 2–7 || Max Fried (14–7) || Aaron Nola (9–9) || — || 27,664 || 81–77
|- style="background:#fbb;"
| 159 || September 30 || @ Braves || 3–5 || Ian Anderson (9–5) || Kyle Gibson (10–9) || Will Smith (37) || 38,235 || 81–78

|- style="background:#bfb;"
| 160 || October 1 || @ Marlins || 5–0 || Ranger Suárez (8–5) || Sandy Alcántara (9–15) || — || 8,469 || 82–78
|- style="background:#fbb;"
| 161 || October 2 || @ Marlins || 1–3 || Jesús Luzardo (6–9) || Hans Crouse (0–2) || Dylan Floro (14) || 9,655 || 82–79
|- style="background:#fbb;"
| 162 || October 3 || @ Marlins || 4–5 || Zach Thompson (3–7) || Héctor Neris (4–7) || Dylan Floro (15) || 9,149 || 82–80
|-

Season notes

April

The Phillies opened the season at home with a three-game series against the division rival Atlanta Braves. On opening day, Jean Segura hit a walk-off single in the 10th inning to help the Phillies win 3–2 to start the year. Zack Wheeler pitched seven innings, allowing one hit, no runs, and striking out 10 while adding two hits and two RBIs on offense to lead the Phillies to a 4–0 victory over the Braves in game two. The Phillies completed the series sweep on Easter Sunday, beating the Braves 2–1 backed by a strong start from Zach Eflin and their first home run of the season, coming off the bat of backup catcher Andrew Knapp. The Phillies continued their homestand with a three-game series against the New York Mets, who were playing their first series of the season after a COVID-19 outbreak led their planned opening against the Washington Nationals to be postponed. In game one of the series, the Phillies came back from a 2–0 deficit by scoring five runs in the eighth inning and then holding on to win 5–3 for their fourth consecutive win to start the season. The Phillies dropped their first game of the season on April 6, falling to the Mets 8–4, saddled by leaving seven runners on base as well as an inning in which relief pitcher Vince Velasquez walked four hitters, all of whom scored for the Mets. In the rubber match of the three-game series, the Phillies beat the Mets 8–2, powered by a pair of three-run home runs, one from Alec Bohm and the other from J. T. Realmuto.

After an off day, the Phillies' season continued with a road trip that began in Atlanta. They lost the first game of a three-game series against the Braves 8–1. The Phillies dropped the second game of the series 5–4, a game in which they relinquished a lead built in the first inning and fell behind twice after ties. After again giving up three runs in the first inning, the Phillies battled back in the series' third game, taking the lead in the top of the ninth inning on a controversial sacrifice fly in which Bohm appeared not to touch home plate but was nonetheless called safe, and holding on to win 7–6. The Phillies then traveled to New York to face the Mets in a four-game series. The first game, scheduled for April 12, was rained out and rescheduled as part of a double header to be held on April 13 in which both games would be seven innings instead of the usual nine. In the first game of that doubleheader, the Phillies fought back to tie the game and send it to extra innings, then took the lead in the top of the eighth (the extra inning), but lost in the bottom of the inning when closer Hector Neris surrendered two runs. The Phillies lost the second game of the doubleheader 4–0. After losing once again to slip to 1–5 on the road trip, Bryce Harper spoke to the press, took responsibility for his own struggles at the plate, and suggested the entire offense—except for Realmuto—needed to improve if the Phillies were going to compete in the National League East division. The last game of the series was rained out and postponed until June 25.

The Phillies returned to Philadelphia with a 6–6 record for a six-game homestand, featuring series against the St. Louis Cardinals and San Francisco Giants, managed by former Phillies' skipper Gabe Kapler. In game one of the series against the Cardinals, the Phillies capitalized on a six-run second inning and a strong outing from Eflin, who allowed two runs in seven innings, to earn an 9–2 victory. The Cardinals responded, scoring six runs off of Matt Moore in the third inning on April 17, all with two outs, and hit a total of four home runs (including two by Yadier Molina) to power St. Louis to a 9–4 victory. The Phillies left 11 runners on base, including the bases loaded in the ninth inning, as Moore struggled for his third consecutive outing to start the season. Aaron Nola started the final game of the series and earned his first career nine-inning complete game, a shutout as the Phillies beat the Cardinals 2–0, winning the rubber match of the series and advancing above .500 for the season. On April 19, the Giants beat the Phillies 2–0 in game one of a three game series. The Phillies left 11 runners on base and were hitless in eight at-bats with runners in scoring position. The Phillies leapt out to a 4–0 lead the next day and carried a lead into the eighth inning when the Giants notched a pair of three-run home runs to come from behind and beat the Phillies 10–7, handing the Phillies their second straight loss and putting them below .500 for the first time of the season. The Phillies salvaged the final game of the series in walk-off fashion when Knapp drove in Harper on an RBI single in the ninth inning. Mickey Moniak hit his first career home run, a three-run shot in the second inning, while Nick Maton, in his second career game, posted three hits in four at-bats.

The Phillies closed the month of April on a road trip west, beginning with a three-game series against the Colorado Rockies. In game one, despite an early lead and a solid start from Vince Velasquez, the bullpen struggled for the third consecutive game, and the Rockies came back to beat the Phillies 5–4. The Phillies won the second game of the series, but collapsed in the rubber match, surrendering seven runs in the fourth inning en route to a 12–2 loss. Next, the Phillies traveled to St. Louis, Missouri, to face the Cardinals in a four-game series. Wheeler opened the series with a dominant outing, outlasting Adam Wainwright in a pitcher's duel as the Phillies hung on for a 2–1 victory. Game two went to the Cardinals, however, as the Phillies mustered only three hits in the 5–2 defeat. In the sixth inning of game three, Cardinals reliever Génesis Cabrera hit two batters on his first two pitches: Harper in the face and Didi Gregorius in the back. Harper left the game early, both benches were warned, and Joe Girardi was ejected from the game after arguing with the home plate umpire. McCutchen hit a go-ahead RBI single the next at bat, and the Phillies came back to win the game 5–3. The Phillies lost the final game of the series 4–3 on a walk-off wild pitch thrown by David Hale in the tenth inning.

The Phillies returned home on April 30 to open a series against the Mets. Despite mustering only three hits, the Phillies managed to win game one by a score of 2–1. Chase Anderson earned his first win as a Phillie and Sam Coonrod picked up his first save as a Phillie. The team's only two runs came on an uncaught third strike with the bases loaded. With the win, the Phillies moved to 13–13 on the season, closing the first month of the season at .500 and leading the National League East. As of the end of the month, the Phillies were without Segura and Archie Bradley, who were on the injured list due to a hamstring injury and oblique injury respectively, and without Gregorius, Harper, and Realmuto, who missed time due to more minor injuries sustained during the previous week of play. Ronald Torreyes and Matt Moore were both on the COVID-19 list (either for having tested positive or been exposed) and expected to return early in May.

May

The Phillies continued their series against the Mets to open the month of May, dropping its second game, on May 1, 5–4. Zack Wheeler had given up four runs in the first inning, but proceeded to throw six scoreless innings after that, allowing the Phillies to battle back and tie the game at four. In the top of the ninth, however, Michael Conforto homered off of Hector Neris to retake the lead for the Mets. The Phillies jumped out to a 4–2 lead in the series rubber match, but surrendered six runs in the eighth inning to let the Mets take an 8–4 lead. In the ninth, Rhys Hoskins hit what appeared to be a game-tying three-run home run, but after an instant replay umpires ruled that the ball did not leave the field, meaning Hoskins had to go back to second base. The Phillies lost 8–7. The Phillies' homestand continued with a four-game series against the Milwaukee Brewers. In game one, the Phillies took an early lead with a two-run home run by J. T. Realmuto. The Brewers narrowed the deficit to one run in the eighth inning, but Hector Neris secured a five-out save and the Phillies held on to win 4–3. Vince Velasquez earned his first winning decision of the season. Game two was similarly close. The Phillies jumped out to a 6–1 lead thanks to a pair of solo home runs from Andrew McCutchen, a three-run home run by Brad Miller, and six strong innings of starting pitching by Aaron Nola, but in the seventh inning, the Brewers scored four runs after an issue with the roster printed on the team's lineup card prevented manager Joe Girardi from bringing in his preferred relief pitcher, Enyel De Los Santos. The Phillies held on to win 6–5, benefitting from a five-out save for the second consecutive night, this time from Sam Coonrod. The pattern of an early lead, letting it become close, and holding on in the end repeated itself in the series' third game, when a five-run first inning highlighted by a Didi Gregorius grand slam was all the Phillies would score en route to a 5–4 win.  In game four of the series, the Phillies completed the sweep as Wheeler pitched a complete game shutout in which he surrendered only three hits as the Phillies won 2–0.

The Phillies embarked on a nine-game road trip, beginning in Atlanta. In game one, the Phillies scored six runs in the first inning, including a three-run home run by Odubel Herrera, and won 12–2. Jean Segura returned to the lineup after missing more than two weeks due to injury and posted four hits in five at-bats with two RBIs. In game two, the Phillies took a 3–1 lead into the ninth but surrendered a two-run home run to Pablo Sandoval to send the game into extra innings. The Phillies proceeded to take a one-run lead in the eleventh and a three-run lead in the twelfth, but the Braves fought back on both occasions and notched an 8–7 victory in 12 innings, snapping the Phillies' five-game winning streak. The Braves won game three 6–1 as Nola struggled through four innings and the Phillies' struggles on the road continued. After an off day, the Phillies next traveled to Washington to face the Nationals in a three-game series. In game one, Chase Anderson pitched five innings and allowed two runs, and the Phillies notched six runs, including RBIs from Andrew Knapp, Rhys Hoskins, Andrew McCutchen, and Bryce Harper to win 6–2. The next night, after a defensive miscue that allowed a run to score, Herrera launched a home run to tie the game in the ninth and send it to extra innings, and the Phillies scored three runs in the tenth to win 5–2. With the win, the Phillies clinched their first win of a road series of at least three games since 2019. The Nationals jumped out to an early lead with a pair of two-run home runs in the first inning and beat the Phillies 5–1 to finish the series. 
 
The final three-game set of the Phillies' road trip came against the Toronto Blue Jays, but was played in Florida due to COVID-19 pandemic travel restrictions. Velasquez pitched  innings in which he allowed one run and the Phillies scored five runs in the seventh inning—highlighted by a three-run double from Hoskins—en route to a 5–1 victory in game one of the series. The Phillies lost game two 4–0 as Phillies' injuries began to accumulate. During the second game of the series, both Realmuto and Harper left due to injury, joining Gregorius as unavailable but still on the active roster, and prior to Sunday's game, backup catcher Andrew Knapp sustained an injury, forcing Rafael Marchan to start his first game of the season and leaving the Phillies without any healthy bench players for the series' rubber match. The Blue Jays jumped out to an 8–0 lead, but Nick Maton hit two home runs—the first two of his major league career—and a two-run single to help close the gap. When Scott Kingery left the game, Harper entered the game despite having not started due to injury. In Harper's first at-bat, he attempted only to bunt, but with two outs in the ninth, Harper came to the plate as the potential go-ahead run, the Phillies down two. He struck out, and the Phillies lost 10–8, falling to 4–5 for the road trip.

After a day off, the Phillies returned home for their first series against the division rival Miami Marlins. Prior to the series opener, Gregorius was placed on the injured list, and the Phillies activated Ronald Torreyes, who had not played since mid-April, to fill his spot on the roster. During game one, Torreyes pinch hit with the bases loaded in the eighth inning of a tied game and hit a two-run double to give the Phillies the lead. They won 8–3. The Marlins controlled game two, however, limiting the Phillies to just one run—the 250th career home run for Andrew McCutchen—en route to a 3–1 victory. Velasquez was scheduled to start game three of the series, but about 20 minutes before the game began, he was scratched due to a numb finger, forcing David Hale to make a spot start. The Phillies could not muster any runs on offense, however, and lost to the Marlins 6–0.

The Phillies' struggles continued as they opened a three-game series against the Boston Red Sox, dropping game one 11–3 amid a raft of errors, miscues, and strikeouts. Spencer Howard made his first start of the season in game two and through two dominant innings before struggling in the third, and the Red Sox took a lead they would not relinquish—despite Rhys Hoskins hitting his 100th career home run, the Phillies lost 4–3, their fourth consecutive defeat, falling two games below .500 for the first time since May 2 and only the second time overall. Wheeler struck out 12 over  innings and Miller hit a three-run home run in the first inning of the series' final game. The Phillies held the lead and won 6–2.

The Phillies closed the month on a road trip that began with a four-game series in Miami. Their defensive struggles continued in game one, which they lost to the Marlins 9–6, prompting a reaction from Girardi that the time for such miscues had passed: "It is not early. It’s not late, but it’s not early. We’re in the middle of the season and we need to play better." The next night, the Phillies mustered only two hits, but thanks to six shutout innings from Velasquez and three shutout innings from the bullpen, managed to win game two of the series 2–0. In game three, the Phillies squandered a lead and fell to the Marlins 4–2 as they continued to be without Harper, Realmuto, and Gregorius. The Phillies salvaged game four, winning 3–2 after Herrera led off the top of the ninth with a triple and scored on a fielder's choice to break the tie. Howard, Ranger Suarez, José Alvarado, and Neris combined to allow just two runs. After an off day, the Phillies traveled to Tampa Bay for a two-game series against the Rays. In game one, the Phillies twice dug out of deficits to tie the game—first via a two-run double from Torreyes and later via a home run from Matt Joyce, his first hit in 28 at-bats—and Wheeler struck out a career high 14 batters over seven innings, but they never took a lead. The Rays won 5–3. The Phillies dropped the second and final game of the series as well, falling 6–2 despite bringing the tying run to the plate in the ninth inning. To close out the month, the Phillies fell 11–1 in a Memorial Day match against the Cincinnati Reds, with Vince Velasquez allowing eight runs in the first three innings, while opposing pitcher Wade Miley held the Phillies to one run in six frames.

June 
The Phillies continued their series against the Reds to open the month of June, tying a franchise record with seven home runs in a 17–3 victory. Ronald Torreyes hit his first home run since 2017, while Aaron Nola became the fastest Phillies pitcher to record 1,000 career strikeouts. The Phillies tied their franchise record by hitting seven home runs in the game: Torreyes, Rhys Hoskins, and Matt Joyce each hit one, while Odubel Herrera and Andrew McCutchen hit two. The final game of the series was rained out.

The Phillies then returned home to begin a series against the Nationals. In game one, Zack Wheeler and Max Scherzer engaged in a pitchers' duel that Scherzer won as the Nats hung on 2–1. Bryce Harper returned to action and Spencer Howard started game two for the Phillies but lasted only  innings. The Phillies' bullpen—Ranger Suarez, Archie Bradley, Sam Coonrod, Jose Alvarado, and Connor Brogdon—combined to throw the final  innings, allowing only one run, as Brogdon recorded his first career save as the Phillies won 5–2. The Phillies won the series rubber match 12–6 in a four-and-a-half hour game that included J. T. Realmuto's 100th career home run, Andrew McCutchen's 1,000th career run scored, Cristopher Sánchez's major league debut, and a 20-minute delay in the eighth inning when the netting behind home plate fell onto the field. The homestand continued with a three-game series against the Atlanta Braves. Prior to the series opening, the Phillies sent Nick Maton back to the minor leagues and called up Luke Williams to make his major league debut. Although Williams notched his first major league hit, Aaron Nola's struggles continued in game one, and the Phillies blew a lead and lost 9–5. Zach Eflin and Ranger Suarez combined to allow one run over nine innings in game two, but the Phillies were held scoreless until the bottom of the ninth when, in his first major league start, Luke Williams hit a two-run walk-off home run to give the Phillies a 2–1 victory. After Zack Wheeler pitched eight shutout innings in the June 10 rubber match, striking out 12 batters, Hector Néris and Jose Alvárado proceeded to give up three runs in the ninth and tenth inning. Shortstop Jean Segura hit a two-run walk-off RBI single in the bottom of the 10th inning to win the game 4–3 and take the series. The Phillies had a day off before welcoming the New York Yankees to town for a two-game series. In the first game, the Phillies jumped out to a 7–2 lead before the Yankees tied it up in the top of the ninth inning, a blown save by Hector Neris. In the tenth inning, however, Jean Segura hit a walk-off single for the second consecutive game—the Phillies' third straight walk-off win—and the Phillies won 8–7. The next day, the Phillies' victory was more emphatic as they completed a two-game sweep of the Yankees behind  shutout innings from Nola, putting the Phillies above .500 for the first time in the month of June.

The Phillies then traveled west for a three-game series against the Los Angeles Dodgers. Spencer Howard started the first game, giving up two home runs to Will Smith and Chris Taylor, respectively, in the 3–1 loss. The following day, a seventh-inning home run from Mookie Betts crushed the Phillies' comeback, while both Bryce Harper and Jean Segura exited the 5–3 loss due to injury. In the final game of the series, Wheeler, Alvarado, and Neris combined for a shutout to prevent a sweep, while Rhys Hoskins broke his 0-for-33 streak with a solo home run in the 2–0 win. The Phillies continued their California road trip with a three-game series against the San Francisco Giants. Despite two early home runs against opposing pitcher Johnny Cueto, a series of defensive and offensive errors and other mistakes caused the Phillies to drop the first game in the series 5–3. Both lineups came out of the gate early in the second game of the series, with the score tied 6–6 by the third inning. The Phillies broke the tie in the sixth inning with a go-ahead home run to Ronald Torreyes, and continued to dominate throughout the back half of the game, winning 13–6. Hoskins, with a double and a three-run home run, finished the game with six RBIs. The Giants ultimately took the series, with Zach Eflin allowing a career-high four home runs, including back-to-back shots from Mike Yastrzemski and Wilmer Flores in the first inning. The Phillies ultimately lost the game 11–2, taking their season record back below .500.

After their west coast tour, the Phillies returned home for a two-game series against the Nationals. Max Scherzer outpitched Wheeler 3–2 in the first match, while Scherzer and Girardi clashed over MLB's new policy on checking for pine tar, resin, and other "sticky substances" that have been used to doctor balls. Scherzer was examined for illegal substances after the first and third inning, per MLB policy, and after the fourth and fifth inning, at Girardi's request. Girardi was ultimately ejected from the game when it was determined that he had made a "request in bad faith" to check Scherzer for foreign substances. In the second game, which lasted 4 hours and 19 minutes, the Phillies proceeded to give up three leads. First, after Velasquez gave up two runs in the fifth inning, he was replaced by Bradley, who surrendered a game-tying three-run home run to Kyle Schwarber. Andrew McCutchen hit a grand slam in the bottom of the fifth to push the Phillies ahead, only for Sam Coonrod and David Hale to surrender six runs, including a grand slam from Josh Bell, to make the score 11–9. The Phillies clawed ahead to 12–11 in the bottom of the eighth, only for Neris to allow hits to three of the first four batters he faced, giving the Nationals a walk-off 13–12 victory.

Following their sweep at the hands of the Nationals, the Phillies headed to Citi Field for four games against the Mets, beginning with a doubleheader on June 25. Both games went into extra innings, with the Phillies and Mets splitting the day. In the first game, Aaron Nola tied Tom Seaver's 1970 record for most consecutive strikeouts, fanning 10 batters in a row, but a blown save from Alvarado overshadowed the accomplishment as the Phillies lost 2–1. Matt Moore started in the second game, his first time pitching in over a month. He pitched five scoreless innings before an error from Alec Bohm tied the score. The Phillies ultimately won the game 2–1 after a shutout eighth inning from Neris. The next day, Nick Maton ended Mets starter Jacob deGrom's streak of 31 shutout innings with an RBI single that brought McCutchen home. DeGrom gave up three hits in six innings to the Phillies, raising his ERA from 0.50 to 0.69, but a fielding error from Hoskins, combined with another blown save from Neris, caused the Phillies to lose 4–3. The Phillies split the series, with Wheeler pitching seven shutout innings in the 4–2 rubber match victory. Prior to returning home, the Phillies traveled to Cincinnati for a makeup game against the Reds. After leading 4–2, they surrendered 10 runs over two innings to lose 12–4, the team's seventh blown save in six games.

The Phillies returned home to close the month with a homestand that began with a three-game set against the Miami Marlins. Vince Velasquez threw seven shutout innings in game one and the Phillies jumped out to a 4–0 lead, which was enough to overcome three runs surrendered by the bullpen over the final two innings to hang on for a 4–3 victory. The Phillies started the second game of the series with an early lead thanks to a solo home run from Bryce Harper, followed by a two-run triple from Nick Maton, but Aaron Nola proceeded to give up seven runs before being relieved by Neftalí Feliz. A poor bullpen performance, combined with Alec Bohm's 12th error of the season, allowed the Marlins to take the game 11–6. The final game of the series was postponed due to inclement weather, and was rescheduled for a doubleheader in July.

July
The Phillies' homestand continued with a three-game series against the San Diego Padres. In game one, Zack Wheeler threw  shutout innings and left the game with a 3–0 lead, but the bullpen blew its eighth save in nine days, and the game went into extra innings. Brad Miller hit a walk-off double to salvage the game and give the Phillies a 4–3 victory. The start to game two of the series was delayed by rain, but the Phillies scored four unanswered runs after falling behind 2–0 in the first inning to win 4–2 with Ranger Suarez earning his first major league save. The Phillies could not pull off a sweep, however, falling out of contention after Hector Neris surrendered six runs in the eighth inning—all with two outs—and losing 11–1.

Next, the Phillies traveled to Chicago to play the Cubs, who were mired with a nine-game losing streak entering the series, for four games. Andrew Knapp, Didi Gregorius, Odubel Herrera, Rhys Hoskins, and Alec Bohm all homered in game one, powering the Phillies to a 13–3 victory as the bullpen allowed only one run in five innings of relief for starting pitcher Matt Moore, who allowed two runs in four innings.

On July 13, J. T. Realmuto and Wheeler represented the Phillies in the All-Star game at Coors Field in Denver. Realmuto started the game (after injury kept Buster Posey from starting) going 1-2 with a home run in the fifth inning; the All-Star game homer was the first for the Phillies in 40 years. Wheeler faced 1 batter in the ninth inning, striking him out on 3 pitches.

August 

On August 8, the Phillies formally retired former pitcher Roy Halladay's No. 34 jersey. Pitcher Zack Wheeler got the start, throwing his first complete game shutout in a 3-0 game and subsequent sweep of the New York Mets. Wheeler retired 22 batters in a row, the first time a Phillies pitcher did so since Halladay's perfect game in 2010.

Roster
All players who made an appearance for the Phillies during 2021 are included.

Farm system

References

External links
 2021 Philadelphia Phillies season at Baseball Reference
 Philadelphia Phillies' official website

Philadelphia Phillies seasons
Philadelphia Phillies
Philadelphia Phillies